Smallburgh Rural District was a rural district in Norfolk, England from 1894 to 1974.

It was formed under the Local Government Act 1894 based on the Smallburgh rural sanitary district. Lying to the south-east of North Walsham it originally had two small areas detached from it main body.

In 1935 it took in parts of Aylsham and Erpingham RDs, thus joining up into a single extent.

In 1974, the district was abolished under the Local Government Act 1972, and became part of the North Norfolk district.

Statistics

Parishes

References

Districts of England created by the Local Government Act 1894
Districts of England abolished by the Local Government Act 1972
Historical districts of Norfolk
Rural districts of England